A number of stock market crashes have occurred in the Hong Kong stock market since the 1960s:

1960s
 Stock disaster in 1965 (Canton Trust Bank run)
 Stock disaster in 1967 (Hong Kong 1967 Leftist riots)

1970s
 Stock disaster in 1973 (1973–74 stock market crash)

1980s
 Stock disaster in 1983 (Negotiation deadlock between China and United Kingdom on Transfer of sovereignty over Hong Kong)
 Stock disaster in 1987 (Black Monday)
 Stock disaster in 1989 (Tiananmen Square protests)

1990s
 Bear market from 1997 to 1998 (Asian financial crisis)

2000s
 Stock disaster in 2000 (Dot-com bubble)
 Stock disaster in 2003 (SARS crisis)
 Stock disaster in 2007, 2008, 2009 (Great Recession)

2010s
 Stock disaster in 2011 (United States debt-ceiling crisis of 2011)
 Stock disaster in 2015, 2016 (2015–16 Chinese stock market turbulence) and (2016 United Kingdom European Union membership referendum)

See also 
 Stock market crash
 Hong Kong Stock Exchange

Finance in Hong Kong
Stock market crashes